Abu Bakr al-Siddiq (also Edward Doulan) was a man from Timbuktu who was enslaved in his early twenties in the city of Bouna, in today's Ivory Coast. He wrote his autobiography, a slave narrative, in Arabic; two copies (one in Jamaice, one near London) were made and translated into English, and published in 1834.

Abu Bakr al-Siddiq was the son of a well-to-do merchant and traveler, who went to Bouna to seek gold. He died in that city, and after his death Abu Bakr visited the grave of his father with his tutor. While they were living there, war broke out; Adrinka, Sultan of Bondoukou, had killed the Sultan of Banda, and extended the conflict to Bouna, which his army overran. In the subsequent chaos Abu Bakr was captured and enslaved. He was made to carry a load down to the Atlantic Coast, where he was sold to Christians, and after three months arrived in Jamaica. A pair of letters at the end of his narrative relate how he was set free by his owner, Alexander Anderson, and gives his "English name" as Edward Doulan.

References

Freedmen
People from Timbuktu
Jamaican slaves
African slaves